Titulares y Más is a Spanish-language late-night television talk and variety show aired by Telemundo. It is the number one sports and entertainment program on Spanish television and runs from Monday to Sunday. Presented by hosts Karim Mendiburu and Ana Jurka every night at 11:35 PM/10:35 CT during the week and on weekends at 11 PM/10 CT or at the end of the local news on Telemundo.

Overview
Titulares y Más debuted on Telemundo in 2005 and became the first viable Late Night offering by Telemundo Network and the first Late Night show of its kind on Spanish Language television.

From 2005 to 2013 it ran on Thursday and Friday nights  at 11:35pm eastern/10:35pm Central, and 11:35pm Pacific until mid 2013 where it began airing every weeknights

References

External links
Deportes Telemundo with Titulares y Más iPhone, iPod Touch, and iPad App

2005 American television series debuts
2000s American television talk shows
2010s American television talk shows
2020s American television talk shows
2000s American variety television series
2010s American variety television series
2020s American variety television series
Telemundo original programming
NBC Deportes